The Bocon toadfish (Amphichthys cryptocentrus) is a species of tropical toadfish in the family Batrachoididae found along the Caribbean-Atlantic Coast of Central and South America from Panama to Brazil in the sub-tidal zone. This species is of minor importance to commercial fisheries. It deposits its eggs on the shells of molluscs and on stones. It is one of the few marine species of fish in which the male guards its fry and juveniles. It feed mostly on molluscs and crustaceans.

References

Batrachoididae
Fish described in 1837